Kiskunhalas is a city in the county of Bács-Kiskun, Hungary.

Railroad 
The city is an important railway junction. It crosses the Budapest-Subotica-Belgrade railway line. The Kiskunfélegyháza railway ends in Kiskunhalas.

Geography 

Name 
Kiskunhalas used to be surrounded by lakes that were rich in fish, Halas in Hungarian, and this gave rise to the town's name. The other part of the name comes from the Hungarian kiskun-, meaning Little Cumania (Hungarian: Kiskunság); Kun was what the Hungarians called the Cuman people.

Croats in Hungary call this town as Olaš. The Croat name came as shortening of its Hungarian name, as it was easier for Croat speakers to pronounce it that way.

History 

Its known history goes back to the 9th century. Kiskunhalas has many archaeological artifacts. These are displayed in the János Thorma Museum, established in honor of an early 20th-century painter who was born and grew up here.

Several villages were known to have been in the area from 895. The place became significant when the Cumans arrived. Its name is derived from the Hungarian word, Kun, for the Cumans. The first written documents mentioning Halas date to 1347.

After 1596, the town lost much of its population due to warfare during the Ottoman invasion and plague.

In the 16th and 17th centuries, Kiskunhalas welcomed the Protestant Reformation. Until 1754 the city was the center of the region, but after that, its significance declined under Catholic rulers because of the local people's support for Protestantism. A Roman Catholic church was built in 1770. A new Reformed (now called Presbyterian) church was built in 1823.

In 1910 the population reached 25,000.

Gallery

Notable natives and residents
János Thorma (1870–1937), a painter and founding member of the influential Nagybanya artists' colony, was born and grew up here.
Zsolt Daczi (1969–2007), hard-rock guitarist, was born here.
Erika Miklósa

Sports 

The town is the birthplace of the highest ranked Hungarian tennis player Ágnes Szávay (at one time ranked 13th in the world), who has won five WTA titles.

Twin towns – sister cities

Kiskunhalas is twinned with:

 Aizkraule, Latvia
 Hódmezővásárhely, Hungary
 Kanjiža, Serbia
 Kronach, Germany
 Nowy Sącz, Poland
 Sfântu Gheorghe, Romania
 Subotica, Serbia

See also
Cuman people

References

External links 

  in Hungarian

Populated places in Bács-Kiskun County
Towns in Hungary